Maharajganj Assembly constituency may refer to
 Maharajganj, Bihar Assembly constituency
 Maharajganj, Uttar Pradesh Assembly constituency